The Huansu H2 is a mini MPV produced by Huansu, a brand of the Chonqing Bisu Automotive Corporation, which is closely related to Beiqi-Yinxiang, a joint venture between Beijing Auto (Beiqi) and the Yinxiang Group.

Overview 

Based on the same platform as the Weiwang M20, Weiwang M30, Weiwang M35, and Changhe Freedom M50, the Huansu H2 shares most of the body parts from the front fenders to the C-pillars. Prices of the Huansu H2 ranges from 39,800 yuan to 66,800 yuan.

The Huansu H2 is powered by engines including a 1.5 liter engine producing 102 hp, a 1.5 liter engine producing 106 hp, and 1.5 liter engine producing 113 hp. Gearbox is either a  5-speed manual transmission or a 7-sped semiautomatic transmission.

Production ceased in 2018 when the Yinxiang Group was in financial problems and failed to restart production in 2019. The Yinxiang Group finally declared bankruptcy in 2021 with products rebranded under the Ruixiang brand.

Ruixiang Boteng V1 
The Ruixiang Boteng V1 is a rebadged version of the Huansu H2. Sold from 2022 after the bankruptcy of the Yinxiang Group and the end of the Huansu brand. The Ruixiang Boteng V1 features a restyled front end and is powered by a 1.5-litre engine producing a maximum power output of 113hp（83kW）and 150N·m shared with the Ruixiang Boteng V2 mated to a 5-speed manual transmission.

References

External links 

Cars introduced in 2015
Minivans
Compact MPVs
Rear-wheel-drive vehicles
Cars of China